Cape Povorotny is a cape on the coast of the Sea of Japan in Primorsky Krai, the Russian Far East.

There is a lighthouse on Cape Povorotny, which is administrated from Nakhodka.

Temperature of sea water westerly and easterly from a cape differs in 3–6 °C.

See also
 

Povorotny
Landforms of the Sea of Japan
Landforms of Primorsky Krai
Pacific Coast of Russia
Nakhodka